
Gmina Wolsztyn is an urban-rural gmina (administrative district) in Wolsztyn County, Greater Poland Voivodeship, in west-central Poland.

Villages
Apart from the town of Wolsztyn, Gmina Wolsztyn contains the villages and settlements of Adamowo, Barłożnia Gościeszyńska, Berzyna, Błocko, Chorzemin, Gościeszyn, Karpicko, Kębłowo, Krutla, Niałek Wielki, Nowa Dąbrowa, Nowa Obra, Nowe Tłoki, Nowy Widzim, Obra, Powodowo, Rudno, Stara Dąbrowa, Stary Widzim, Stradyń, Świętno, Tłoki, Wilcze and Wroniawy.

Neighbouring gminas
Gmina Wolsztyn is bordered by the gminas of Kargowa, Kolsko, Przemęt, Rakoniewice, Siedlec and Sława.

References

Polish official population figures 2006

Wolsztyn
Wolsztyn County